Ein el-Jarba is an Early Chalcolithic settlement ascribed to the Wadi Rabah culture, dating to the 6th millennium BC, located ca. 20 km south-east of Haifa, Israel in the Jezreel Valley. Excavation at the site has been renewed on behalf of Hebrew University of Jerusalem, Israel.

Geography 
The site is located at the foot of the Menashe Heights, in the Jezreel Valley, which was – and still is – a main artery connection the Mediterranean coast with the Jordan Rift Valley. Ein el-Jarba is today in the vicinity of Kibbutz HaZore'a.

Excavation history 

There have been several excavations on the site. Following the uncovering of remains by mechanical work, one season of excavation was conducted by J. Kaplan in 1966. This was followed by remains being discovered in 1979 c. 75m west of the area uncovered by J. Kaplan; a salvage excavation was conducted in 1980 by E. Meyerhof, recording substantial architectural remains. Several other sites with Wadi Rabah remains were uncovered nearby, including Tell Qiri (Baruch 1987), Hazorea (Anati 1971; Anati et al. 1973; Meyerhof 1988), Tell Zeriq (Oshri 2000), Abu Zureiq (Garfinkel and Matskevich 2002) and Mishmar HaEmek stratum V (Getzov and Barzilai 2011). There was also a surface collection survey conducted in 1973 by E. Anati (1973:29-40).

A ca. 65 m² large excavation area at Ein el-Jarba excavated by Kaplan in 1966 yielded four phases of Chalcolithic occupation with architectural remains as well as burials (Arensburg 1970). The stratigraphic accumulation between virgin soil and topsoil was only ca. 1 m (Kaplan 1969: 4).

Renewed Excavation 
The archaeological work at Ein el-Jarba was renewed in 2013 until 2016 on behalf of the Institute of Archaeology of Hebrew University of Jerusalem, Israel, directed by Katharina Streit, in cooperation with the Jezreel Valley Regional Project. This excavation uncovered a two-period settlement with remains dating to the Early Bronze Age IB (4th millennium calBC) and the Early Chalcolithic (6th millennium calBC). The Early Bronze Age remains consist of several substrata of oval houses, as well as living floors, pits and a stone lined silo. The Early Chalcolithic phase consists of several floors and decayed mudbrick material, as well as a plastered surface with circular installation. The ceramic assemblage of the Early Chalcolithic phase is dominated by classic Wadi Rabah style pottery.

See also 
Archaeology of Israel

References

External links 
 http://eineljarba.wordpress.com/
 http://www.jezreelvalleyregionalproject.com/

Archaeological sites in Israel